is the fifth  single of NYC released on May 25, 2012. It was certified Gold by the Recording Industry Association of Japan.

Single description
“Haina!” is described as the perfect summer tune that everyone can sing and dance to. It was chosen as the ending theme song for the TBS variety program called ‘Akarui☆Mirai‘, which started airing last April 22, 2012.

The single will be released in three different version. Limited Edition A, Limited Edition B and a Regular Edition.

Track listing

Chart performance
Haina! debuted at no. 2 spot just behind AKB48's "Manatsu no Sounds Good!" on Oricon Daily Single Chart with 38,740 sales. It sold a total of 91,082 copies in its first week.

Charts and certifications

Charts

Sales and certifications

Release

References

2012 singles
J-pop songs
2012 songs